The 2015 Wake Forest Demon Deacons men's soccer team represents Wake Forest University during the 2015 NCAA Division I men's soccer season. It is the 69th season of the university fielding a program. It the program's first season with Bobby Muuss as head coach. Muuss, the fourth head coach in program history, formerly coached Denver, and took over for Jay Vidovich, who left for a head coaching position with Portland Timbers 2. The team finished the regular season ranked #1 nationally and with the best record in the Atlantic Coast Conference, earning the top seed both in the 2015 ACC Men's Soccer Tournament and the 2015 NCAA Division I Men's Soccer Championship.

Roster 

As of 2015:

Schedule 

|-
!colspan=6 style="background:#000000; color:#cfb53b;"| Preseason
|-

|-
!colspan=6 style="background:#000000; color:#cfb53b;"| Regular season
|-

|-
!colspan=6 style="background:#000000; color:#cfb53b;"| ACC Tournament
|-

|-
!colspan=6 style="background:#000000; color:#cfb53b;"| NCAA Tournament
|-

See also 

 Wake Forest Demon Deacons men's soccer
 2015 Atlantic Coast Conference men's soccer season
 2015 NCAA Division I men's soccer season
 2015 ACC Men's Soccer Tournament
 2015 NCAA Division I Men's Soccer Championship

References 

Wake Forest Demon Deacons
Wake Forest Demon Deacons men's soccer seasons
Wake Forest Demon Deacons, Soccer
Wake Forest Demon Deacons
Wake Forest Demon Deacons